Ryszard Bogusz (born 2 March 1951 in Bielsko-Biała) is a Lutheran theologian and bishop of the diocese Wroclaw of the Evangelical Augsburg Church in Poland.

In 1976 he entered as vicar the parish Church Opatrzności Bożej (destiny of God) in Wroclaw. In 1981 he entered the Church as administrator and became then minister of the Church. Since 1984 he is the bishop within the diocese Wroclaw of the Polish Evangelical Church.

Ryszard Bogusz is an initiator of many international contacts between different Churches, and he is the current secretary of the Polish Ecumenical Council where there are many other Protestant Churches.
 Ryszard Bogusz

1951 births
Polish Lutheran bishops
Polish Lutheran theologians
Living people
Officers Crosses of the Order of Merit of the Federal Republic of Germany
People from Bielsko-Biała